Mobeen Azhar (born 1980) is a British journalist, radio and television presenter and filmmaker. He produces investigative reports and films for the BBC exploring themes related to politics, true crime, extremism, counter terrorism and sexuality. He has presented and produced international documentaries for BBC One, BBC Two and BBC Three and is a regular BBC Asian Network presenter.

In 2017, he won a BAFTA for producing the BBC series Muslims Like Us and in 2020, he won a Royal Television Society Award for presenting BBC documentary Hometown: A Killing. In 2019, Azhar became a presenter on new BBC Three show Plastic Surgery Undressed.

Early life and education 
Azhar was born and raised in Huddersfield in Yorkshire and is of British Asian background. His father was a bus driver and a shop keeper who encouraged Azhar to go to university.

At university, Azhar gained a law degree and then returned to study broadcast journalism at Leeds Trinity University after a gap year.

Career 
In 2012, Azhar was part of a team reporting from Waziristan in Pakistan on US drone strikes on the Afghan border for a BBC Panorama special, The Secret Drone War.

In August 2013, he investigated gay life in urban Pakistan for Assignment: Inside Gay Pakistan on the BBC World Service and on BBC Radio 4.

Azhar has written about and reported extensively on musician Prince. In 2015, he presented BBC documentary Hunting for Prince’s Vault and in September 2016, Azhar's debut book Prince Stories from the Purple Underground: 1958-2016 was published by Welbeck Publishing.

In 2016, Azhar joined a police team of "Taliban Hunters" in Karachi, Pakistan, as part of documentary reporting for BBC Panorama. During filming he was shot at by the Taliban.

In February 2016, Azhar presented the BBC Three documentary Webcam Boys, spending a couple of months with men who make money from performing in online sex shows.

In 2019, Azhar presented BBC documentaries The Satanic Verses: 30 Years On, A Black and White Killing: The Case that Shook America and The Best Pakistani Transgender Retirement Home.

In 2019, Azhar also presented six-part BBC documentary series Hometown: A Killing, reporting on the police shooting of Yassar Yaqub in Huddersfield in 2017. Yasser Yaqub's father Mohammed Yaqub, who featured in the series, claimed Azhar had attempted to "smear" his son's name. Huddersfield MP Barry Sheerman also criticized the programme, claiming it depicted the town as "a hotbed of violent crime". The docu-series went on to win several awards.

During the same year, Azhar became a presenter on BBC Three show Plastic Surgery Undressed, alongside Vogue Williams.

In May 2021, Azhar presented a BBC Two documentary The Battle For Britney: Fans, Cash, And A Conservatorship, reporting from California and Louisiana on the #FreeBritney movement who claim music star Britney Spears is being "kept a virtual prisoner in her own home" through a conservatorship managed by her father. Spears was reported to have criticized the documentary, describing it as "hypocritical".

In May 2021, Azhar presented a four-part BBC series Scam City: Money, Mayhem and Maseratis, investigating the world of Instagram scams, forex trading and pyramid schemes.

In 2022, Azhar presented a six-part true-crime series Santa Claus the Serial Killer on the relaunched BBC Three channel, exploring the case of serial killer Bruce McArthur. The series was filmed in Canada and explores themes of race, faith, culture and sexuality. The Guardian criticised the series: "At times there is a sense that this is less an investigation and more a whistlestop tour of the Bruce McArthur murder tourism industry. These people have told their stories countless times now, and there is something truly unedifying about Azhar’s (and the audience’s) willingness to rubberneck at so much well-worn trauma."

Azhar was appointed a member of the Advisory Board for the 2022 Edinburgh TV Festival, led by Afua Hirsch, appointed Advisory Chair in March 2022.

In February 2023, the BBC announced Azhar would front a new documentary and podcast about Kanye West “unfolding against the backdrop of Ye’s 2024 election campaign, and at a time when his behaviour has sparked outrage and a re-evaluation of his place in popular culture". Provisionally titled We Need to Talk about Kanye, the documentary will be broadcast on BBC Two and will run alongside an accompanying eight-part podcast series on BBC Music.

In March 2023, Azhar presented Predator: The Secret Scandal of J-Pop, a documentary exploring allegations of sexual abuse against Japanese pop mogul Johnny Kitagawa. Filmed in Tokyo, the programme was broadcast on BBC Two.

Awards 
In May 2017, Azhar won a BAFTA for his work as a producer on the BBC series Muslims Like Us.

In 2018, Azhar’s show on the BBC Asian Network won Best Radio Show at the Asian Media Awards.

In June 2019, Azhar won the first Sandford St Martin Journalism Award for his BBC radio programme The Dawn of British Jihad.

In 2020, Azhar won the Royal Television Society 'Presenter of the Year' award for Hometown: A Killing. In the same year, he also won 'Best Presenter' at the Grierson Awards for the same documentary series.

Azhar has won an Amnesty International award for Panorama: The Secret Drone War.

He has also been nominated for a Foreign Press Association Award for his BBC Radio 4 programme Fatwa and for his documentary Inside Gay Pakistan.

In August 2022, Azhar received an honorary fellowship at Leeds Trinity University, where he studied journalism for the first time in 18 years.

Personal life 
Azhar is openly gay; and is a Muslim. He is an avid fan of musician Prince and horror films.

References

External links 
 Mobeen Azhar official website

Living people
21st-century British journalists
21st-century English writers
BBC newsreaders and journalists
BBC television presenters
English people of Asian descent
English actors of South Asian descent
English television journalists
English television presenters
People from Huddersfield
People from West Yorkshire
Television personalities from Yorkshire
English radio presenters
British LGBT journalists
British LGBT broadcasters
1980 births